The Church of St Mary, Upper Moss Lane, Hulme, Manchester, is a Gothic Revival former church by J. S. Crowther built in 1853–58. It was designated a Grade II* listed building on 3 October 1974.

The church is of "coursed sandstone rubble with ashlar dressings (and a) slate roof". It is in early 14th century geometrical style, following "Lincolnshire exemplars". Part of a group of Victorian buildings, including a listed rectory, the Pevsner Buildings of England volume for Manchester describes the church as having "stood through two complete cycles of urban decay, dereliction, destruction and renewal, standing alone amid utter desolation in the 1960s and again in the 1990s".  
At the time of listing it was used by an African Methodist Evangelical congregation, but it has since been converted into flats, its interior "horribly divided".

See also

Listed buildings in Manchester-M15
List of works by J. S. Crowther

References

Bibliography

Former churches in Greater Manchester
Grade II* listed churches in Manchester
Churches in Manchester
Gothic Revival church buildings in Greater Manchester
1858 establishments in England
Churches completed in 1858